{{DISPLAYTITLE:C3H4N2}}
The molecular formula C3H4N2 may refer to:

 Diazoles, a heterocycle with two nitrogen atoms in the ring
 Imidazole, with non-adjacent nitrogen atoms
 Pyrazole, with adjacent nitrogen atoms